Softades is a village in the Larnaca District of Cyprus, located 3 km west of Kiti. Prior to 1964 the village was inhabited almost exclusively by Turkish Cypriots.

References

Communities in Larnaca District
Turkish Cypriot villages depopulated after the 1974 Turkish invasion of Cyprus